This is the discography of Chinese singer Wang Bowen. In China, he has sold over  units albums. His expanded discography consists of two extended plays, one soundtrack and ten singles.

Albums

Extended plays

Soundtracks

Singles

As featured artist

References

Pop music discographies
Discographies of Chinese artists